The European School of Political and Social Sciences (referred to as  ESPOL) is a non-profit private higher education institution located in Lille, France, and a member institution of Lille Catholic University, France's largest private university. Founded in 2012, ESPOL is dedicated to the study and research of political and social sciences, and awards state-recognized bachelors and master's.

Campus 

ESPOL is based in the Vauban neighborhood in Lille, Hauts-de-France, France, on the premises of Lille Catholic University's campus, and within walking distance to the Citadel of Lille.

Transport 
The nearest Lille Metro stations are Gambetta and Cormontaigne.

Academic profile

Admission 
Admission to ESPOL is competitive: for undergraduate programmes the admission rate ranges from 5 to 10%. All undergraduate applications are made through Parcoursup, the online admission platform hosted by the Ministry of Higher Education, Research and Innovation. In 2016–17, entry qualifications of first-year undergraduate students averaged 14.74 (out of a possible 20) in the French Baccalauréat.

Postgraduate students at ESPOL are required to have an undergraduate level degree (180 ECTS) at the time of entry and provide proof of English language proficiency. Master's applications are made through the University's admission platform. The admission rate ranges from 10 to 15%, thus making it highly competitive.

In the 2016–17 academic year, ESPOL had a domicile breakdown of 91:9 of French:non-French students respectively in the undergraduate programmes, of 30:70 of French:non-French students respectively in the master's programmes, and with a female to male ratio of 71:29. In the same year, 25% of ESPOL students were scholarship holders.

Tuition fees at ESPOL vary according to household income, household composition and a needs-based evaluation index. Tuition fees for both bachelors and masters range from 2885 € to 9500 €. Merit-based scholarships are also available, ranging from 1000€ to 2000€.

Programmes and degrees 
The School offers 3 bachelor's degrees and 4 master's degrees. Its bachelor's programmes are bilingual (French/English) whereas its master's programmes are taught only in English

Bachelor's degrees 
 Bachelor's degree in Political Science
 Bachelor's degree in International Relations
 Bachelor's degree in Philosophy, Politics and Economics

Master's degrees 
 Master's degree in Global and European Politics
 Master's degree in Food Politics and Sustainable Development
 Master's degree in International and Security Politics
 Master's degree in Digital Politics and Governance

Library 
ESPOL students have access to the BU Vauban network of 9 libraries: 6 in Lille, 2 in Paris and 1 in Nice, totalling 400,000 books. The library network is a member of Couperin, a consortium representing more than 250 academic institutions in France, which facilitates and negotiates access to academic journals, databases, e-books and other online resources offered by academic publishers.

Public lectures and guest speakers 
Recent prominent speakers at the University and the School have included Thomas J. Biersteker, Christian de Boissieu, Cyril Dion, Bernard Kouchner, Chantal Mouffe, Jeremy Rifkin, Gilles Pargneaux, Luuk van Middelaar, Johan C. Verbeke, Muhammad Yunus and Pierre-Yves Neron.

Partnerships 
ESPOL has academic partnerships in teaching and research with 140 universities across the world, including

 in Europe: Liverpool Hope University, University of Erfurt, Queen's University Belfast, Saint-Louis University, Brussels, Charles III University of Madrid, University of Giessen, University of Florence, Galatasaray University, European University of Madrid, Kaunas University of Technology.
 in North America: Villanova University, King's University College, Catholic University of America, University of Monterrey, North Carolina State University, University of San Francisco, University of Memphis, University of Alberta, University of Ottawa, Universidad Iberoamericana.
 in South America: Latin American Social Sciences Institute, Pontifical Catholic University of Rio de Janeiro, Pontifical Catholic University of Argentina, Universidade de Ribeirão Preto, Universidad Mayor, Pontifical Catholic University of Chile, Del Rosario University, Pontificia Universidad Católica del Ecuador, Federico Santa María Technical University.

Student life

Students' union 
There are over 30 clubs and societies under the umbrella of the ESPOL students' union, including ESPOMUN, the Model United Nations delegation at ESPOL, the Alumni network, the ESPOL debating society "Révolte-toi Espol".

Sporting activity is coordinated by the ESPOL sports office (BDS, Bureau des Sports).

References

External links 
ESPOL
Lille Catholic University

Universities and colleges in France
Catholic universities and colleges in France
Political science in France
Universities in Hauts-de-France
Universities and colleges in Lille
Educational buildings in Lille